Listed below are executive orders numbered 10914-11127 signed by U.S. President John F. Kennedy. His executive orders and presidential proclamations are also listed on WikiSource.



Executive orders

1961

1962

1963

References

External links
 Executive Orders Disposition Tables National Archives, Federal Register

 
United States federal policy

John F. Kennedy-related lists